The Duncan Ranges are a subrange of the Selkirk Mountains of the Columbia Mountains in southeastern British Columbia, Canada, located west of the Duncan River, southeast of Revelstoke.

Notable peaks
Albert Peak
North Albert Peak
Mount Cartier
Ghost Peak
Mount Mackenzie
Mount Templeman

Sub-ranges
Badshot Range

References

Duncan Ranges in the Canadian Mountain Encyclopedia

Selkirk Mountains